Cyriacus of Ancona or Ciriaco de' Pizzicolli (31 July 1391 – 1453/55) was a restlessly itinerant Italian humanist and antiquarian  who came from a prominent family of merchants in Ancona, a maritime republic on the Adriatic. He has been called the Father of Archaeology:

"Cyriac of Ancona was the most enterprising and prolific recorder of Greek and Roman antiquities, particularly inscriptions, in the fifteenth century, and the general accuracy of his records entitles him to be called the founding father of modern classical archeology."

Life 

Unlike many library antiquarians, Cyriacus traveled at first for his family's ventures then to satisfy his own curiosity, all around the Eastern Mediterranean, noting down his archaeological discoveries in his day-book, Commentaria, that eventually filled seven volumes. He made numerous voyages in Southern Italy, Dalmatia and Epirus and into the Morea, to Egypt, to Chios, Rhodes and Beirut, to Anatolia and Constantinople, during which he wrote detailed descriptions of monuments and ancient remains, illustrated by his drawings. 

His detailed on-site observations, particularly in lands of the Ottoman Empire, make him one of the precursors of modern archaeology. His accuracy as a meticulous epigrapher was praised by Giovanni Battista de Rossi.

His years in Rome studying Latin are commemorated by his drawings of many of the monuments and antiquities of ancient Rome. In Constantinople he studied Greek. He enjoyed the patronage of Eugenius IV, who had been Papal legate in the March of Ancona from 1420 to 1422, Cosimo de' Medici, and the Visconti of Milan. He was in Siena at the court of Sigismund, and when Sigismund came to Rome for his coronation as Emperor, Cyriacus was his guide among Rome's antiquities. Two years later in 1435, Cyriacus was back exploring in Greece and Egypt.

He was probably the first traveler who recognized the importance of the ruins of Eretria. On 5 April 1436, he described and sketched a plan of the ancient city walls, indicating the position of the theatre and the fortifications of the acropolis and mentioning the existence of inscriptions. He collected a great store of inscriptions, manuscripts, and other antiquities. Through a drawing made for Cyriacus, the appearance of the Column of Justinian is recorded for us, before it was dismantled by the Ottomans. He returned in 1426 after having visited Rhodes, Beirut, Damascus, Cyprus, Mytilene, Thessalonica, and other places.

Pushed by a strong curiosity, he also bought a great number of documents which he used to write six volumes of Commentarii ("Commentaries"). The ravages of time have been unkind to Cyriacus's lifework, which he never published, but which fortunately circulated in manuscript and in copies of his drawings; the Commentarii were lost in the 1514 fire of the library of Alessandro and Costanza Sforza in Pesaro. A series of Pizzicolli's manuscripts about Ancona was destroyed during a fire of the city's archives in 1532.

He retired to Cremona, where he lived so quietly that the year of his death is not certain. Long after his death, some surviving texts were printed: Epigrammata reperta per Illyricum a Kyriaco Anconitano (Rome, 1664), Cyriaci Anconitani nova fragmenta notis illustrata, (Pesaro, 1763) and Itinerarium (Florence, 1742).

Notes

References

Sources

Cyriac of Ancona: Later Travels (2004) edited and translated by Edward W. Bodnar and Clive Foss. 
Cyriacus of Ancona and Athens (1960), edited and translated by Edward Bodnar. Vol. XLIII of Latomus Revue d'Études Latines.
Cyriacus of Ancona's Journeys in the Propontis and the Northern Aegean, 1444-1445 (1976), edited and translated by Edward Bodnar and C. Mitchell.
 BBC 4, In the Beginning Archaeology: A Secret History, (0:10:37 - 0:17:39) (text on: Ep. 1)

Studies
 Michail Chatzidakis, "Antike Prägung. Ciriaco d'Ancona und die kulturelle Verortung Griechenlands," in Fremde in der Stadt. Ordnungen, Repräsentationen und soziale Praktiken (13.-15. Jahrhundert). Hrsg. von Peter Bell, Dirk Suckow und Gerhard Wolf. Frankfurt am Main u.a., Peter Lang, 2010 (Inklusion/Exklusion, Studien zu Fremdheit und Armut von der Antike bis zur Gegenwart, 16),

External links

Catholic Encyclopedia: s.v. "Ciriaco d'Ancona"
Cyriaco of Ancona, 1391-1455?
Cyriaco in the Argolid
Portraits

1391 births
1450s deaths
People from the Province of Ancona
Italian antiquarians
Italian archaeologists
Italian Renaissance humanists
Latin epigraphers
Hellenic epigraphers
Year of death uncertain
15th-century Latin writers
15th-century Italian writers
15th-century antiquarians